Ricardo Rodríguez Marengo (born 10 May 1998) is an Argentine footballer  who played as striker and currently is a free agent.

Early life
Ricardo was born in Buenos Aires, Argentina and moved at the age of 9 to Santiago, Chile after his father was transladed.
He would join the inferior of Universidad Catolica at the age of 12, after his soccer trainer of school recommended him so.

Ricardo made his professional debut on the 17th of December 2015 coming on as a substitute in a 2-1 defeat against Palestino.

References

External links

1997 births
Living people
Chilean footballers
Club Deportivo Universidad Católica footballers
Association football forwards
Argentine footballers
Footballers from Buenos Aires